Gustave Évanturel (March 19, 1879 – February 9, 1934) was an Ontario notary and political figure. He represented Prescott in the Legislative Assembly of Ontario from 1911 to 1923 as a Liberal and Independent Liberal and in the House of Commons of Canada as a Liberal member in 1925.

He was born in Ottawa in 1879, the son of François-Eugène-Alfred Évanturel and Louisa Lee, and educated at the Collège Bourget in Rigaud, Quebec and the Université Laval. In 1910, he married Marie Emilia Chevrier. He was a notary public based in Alfred and president of a mutual life assurance company, L'Alliance Nationale. He also was employed in the Privy Council Department. Évanturel was a strong supporter of bilingual schools in the province. He was elected to the House of Commons in 1925, but was unsuccessful in attempts at reelection in 1926 and 1929. He died in Alfred at the age of 54.

References

External links

1879 births
1934 deaths
Franco-Ontarian people
Liberal Party of Canada MPs
Members of the House of Commons of Canada from Ontario
Ontario Liberal Party MPPs